The Glasgow Tramway and Omnibus Company operated a horse-drawn tramway service in Glasgow between 1872 and 1894. The tram system was then taken into municipal ownership, becoming Glasgow Corporation Tramways.

History

The Glasgow Street Tramways Act was enacted by Parliament in 1870. This legislation allowed Glasgow Town Council to decide whether or not to have tramways within Glasgow. In 1872, the Town Council laid a 2½-mile route from St George's Cross to Eglinton Toll (via New City Road, Cambridge Street, Sauchiehall Street, Renfield Street and the Jamaica Bridge).

The Tramways Act prohibited the Town Council from directly operating a tram service over the lines. The act further stipulated that a private company be given the operating lease of the tram-lines for a period of 22 years. The St George's Cross to Eglinton Toll tram line was opened on 19 August 1872 with a horse-drawn service by the Glasgow Tramway and Omnibus Company. 

The company expanded in 1893 by leasing the Glasgow and Ibrox Tramway and the Vale of Clyde Tramway.

Municipal takeover

The tramway business was acquired by Glasgow Corporation in 1894 (except for the routes of the Glasgow and Ibrox Tramway and the Vale of Clyde Tramway). With modernisation, including electrification, Glasgow Corporation Tramways continued operating until 1962.

References

Tram transport in Scotland
4 ft 7¾ in gauge railways in Scotland
1872 establishments in Scotland
1894 disestablishments in Scotland
Transport companies established in 1872
Transport companies disestablished in 1894
British companies disestablished in 1894
British companies established in 1872